We Survive  is the third English language studio album and sixth in total by the Danish singer and songwriter Medina. It was released worldwide on 26 February 2016 by Labelmade, We Love Music and Universal. The album consists of ten original songs and three translated songs from her Danish singles, "Jalousi", "Når intet er godt nok" and "Giv Slip".

Singles
The title song "We Survive" was released as the album's first single on 12 February 2016, a music video accompanies the track.

Themes

Thematically the album deals with envy, love, rejection, and a sense of emptiness throughout. However other themes include embracing yourself, on tracks like Liquid Courage.

Reception

We Survive received mixed reviews upon release, however there is heavy emotional lyrical content throughout the album. It was considered her darkest albums when it was released.

Track listing

Notes
"Jealousy" is the English version of "Jalousi".
"Good Enough" is the English version of "Når intet er godt nok".
"Let Go" is the English version of "Giv Slip".

Charts

References

Medina (singer) albums
2016 albums
Pop albums by Danish artists